Veolia Water (formerly Vivendi Water, originally Compagnie Générale des Eaux) is the water division of the French company Veolia Environnement and the world's largest supplier of water services.

In 2009, the group posted revenues of €12.56 billion. Of this, 72.9% of turnover comes from Europe; 7.4% from the Americas, 8.5% from Africa, Middle East and India, and 11.2% from the Asia-Pacific region.

History 
The Compagnie Générale des Eaux (CGE) was created in 1853. In 1889, its first research laboratory was established at 52, rue d’Anjou in Paris, France. Veolia Water’s headquarters are still located at this site.

1918 saw the creation of the SADE (Société Auxiliaire des Distributions d'Eau), specialising in water networks and the delivery of drinking water. In 1953, construction began on a CGE water treatment facility at Clay Lane, near London; by 2001, it was the world’s largest ultrafiltration plant, supplying water to 750,000 people in the city.

Veolia Water’s humanitarian crisis response team, Waterforce, was created in 1998, prompted by Hurricane Mitch in Nicaragua and the flooding of the Yangtze River in China.

In 1980, CGE expanded into other businesses such as transport and energy services by acquiring other companies. The original CGE water industry remained as the water division of CGE. In 1998, CGE was renamed Vivendi, and in 1999, the environmental divisions of CGE was consolidated under Vivendi Environnement, with the water division renamed Vivendi Water in 1999. In 2003, Vivendi Environnement was renamed Veolia Environnement. Two years later in 2005, Veolia Environnement united its four global divisions (Environmental Services, Energy, Transport and Water) under the Veolia brand. Vivendi Water thus was renamed Veolia Water.

In 2002, Vivendi Water expanded its municipal water services in 2002 to major cities such as Indianapolis (USA), Bucharest (Romania), Berlin (Germany) and Shanghai (China).

The UK water supply businesses branded as Veolia Water were sold by Veolia Environnement for £1.2 billion on 28 June 2012 to Rift Acquisitions, an entity established by Morgan Stanley and M&G Investments. Veolia Environnement is using the proceeds of the disposal to reduce its debt, as part of a 5bn-euro debt-reduction programme announced in December 2011 and will retain a 10% stake in the new business Affinity Water for at least five years. Affinity Water began operations on 1 October 2012.

Activities

Veolia Water's activities can be grouped into two main areas: providing clean drinking water, and collecting and treating waste water/sewerage water.

Drinking water
Veolia Water sources, treats, stores and transports water from the environment (surface water deposits, rivers and subterranean aquifers) for distribution to populations. Veolia Water supplies nearly 95 million people around the world with drinking water.

Waste water treatment

Veolia Water collects and then treats water in line with national and international regulations. Different treatments are provided depending on the level of pollution. Afterwards, the water re-enters the water cycle. Veolia Water delivers wastewater treatment services to 68 million people around the world and, as of 2009, it managed 3,229 municipal water treatment plants.

In October 2010, Veolia Water was contracted to rebuild a wastewater treatment plant in Lille (France) in a project that will ultimately have the capacity to treat waste water from 620,000 inhabitants in the region. The company also secured the management of the Grand Prado treatment facility on the island of Reunion (France).

Other services 
Veolia Water produces water for industrial processes, and offers treatment, heating, cooling and cleaning applications for industry.  In August 2010, Veolia Water was awarded the wastewater treatment contract for the Petrobras Papa Terra P63 offshore oil production project, located in the Campos Basin, off the coast of Brazil.

Veolia has built 15% of the world’s desalination capacity. Some estimates suggest that the global water desalination market will double in the period 2010-2016.

Veolia Water offers two main technologies: reverse osmosis and thermal desalination. In reverse osmosis, water is passed through membranes under pressure; the membrane allows water to circulate, but captures the salts. During thermal desalination, water is vaporized in distillation chambers to separate out the salts it contains.

Veolia Water also operates in alternative water recycling markets. This involves water that is clean, but not purified for human consumption, and is suitable for irrigation, industrial uses, and the injection and storage of water into underground aquifers after additional treatment.

Veolia Water works to replenish subterranean aquifers, which are being exhausted through over-exploitation in some areas. Replenishment can be achieved with treated water of various kinds: surface water, rainwater and treated wastewater.

Sustainable development
Veolia Water works on reducing the environmental impact of water use through a number of strategies.

 Saving water: reducing leaks in the system and managing consumption through systems such as water meters. 
 Protecting water resources: treating wastewater and preventing pollution, for example by avoiding discharge into aquifers.
 Limiting the environmental impact of energy use: optimizing facilities, exploring water as a source of renewable energy. Veolia Water Solutions and Technologies has begun a "carbon initiative" to analyze the sources of customers' emissions and offer lower-carbon water treatment solutions. 
 Developing alternative resources: recycling treated water, recharging aquifers, desalinating seawater.

In 2008, Veolia Water established Grameen-Veolia Water Ltd in partnership with the Grameen Bank, aiming to provide clean drinking water to 100,000 people in Bangladesh.

Major subsidiaries 
Veolia Water’s subsidiaries include:
 SADE, which to builds and maintains water mains and water networks for delivering and distributing drinking water, and processing waste water.
 Veolia Water Solutions and Technologies provides services to both local authorities and private industry, aiming to help them to reduce their environmental impact. In 2007 a joint venture between Doshion Limited (A Water Solutions Giant in Gujarat, India) and Veolia Water Solutions and Technologies was signed, thus gave formation to Doshion Veolia Water Solutions. This turned out to  not bring any benefits to Veolia's investors and the company's services.
 Two engineering advisory agencies: Seureca (international) and Setude (France-focused). These agencies specialize in water management, water treatment and the environment.
 Krüger A/S, Denmark (Annual revenue €177,000,000 (2008))

Veolia Water also has joint subsidiaries with other Veolia divisions. With Dalkia, it has Proxiserve. This subsidiary offers a number of home-based or domestic solutions, including heating and water distribution systems. With Veolia Environmental Services, it has SEDE Environnement (management of waste sludge) and SIDEF (Services to Industry for the Treatment of Effluent).

In the media

References

External links
 

Water
Water companies of France
Food and drink companies established in 1853
French companies established in 1853
Water privatization